is a railway station operated by JR Kyushu in Chikushino, Fukuoka Prefecture, Japan.

Lines

Only local and (in the case of the Kagoshima Main Line) some rapid services stop at the station.

Layout
The station consists of two side platforms, an island platform and a semi-bay platform serving five tracks. The semi-bay platform is designated as platform 0 and juts into the other side of platform 1 which is a side platform attached to the station building. Platform 0 is used by the Chikuho Main Line only. The station building is a modern concrete structure and houses a waiting area and a JR ticket window (with a Midori no Madoguchi facility). From platform 1, attached to the station building, access to the island and other side platform by means of a footbridge which is served by elevators. A ramp also leads up to the station entrance from the station forecourt.

History 
When the Kyushu Railway was nationalized on 1 July 1907, Japanese Government Railways (JGR) took over control of the station. On 12 October 1909, the station became part of the Hitoyoshi Main Line and then on 21 November 1909, part of the Kagoshima Main Line. With the privatization of Japanese National Railways (JNR), the successor of JGR, on 1 April 1987, JR Kyushu took over control of the station.

Station numbering was introduced on 28 September 2018 with Haruda being assigned station number JB10 for the Kagoshima Main Line and JG05 for the Haruda Line.

Passenger statistics
In fiscal 2016, the station was used by an average of 4,052 passengers daily (boarding passengers only), and it ranked 50th among the busiest stations of JR Kyushu.

See also
 List of railway stations in Japan

References

External links
Haruda (JR Kyushu)

Railway stations in Fukuoka Prefecture
Stations of Kyushu Railway Company
Railway stations in Japan opened in 1889